Bonn (A1413) is the third ship of the s of the German Navy.

Development 

The Berlin-class replenishment ships are the largest vessels of the German Navy. In German, this type of ship is called Einsatzgruppenversorger which can be translated as "task force supplier" though the official translation in English is "combat support ship". 

They are intended to support German naval units away from their home ports. The ships carry fuel, provisions, ammunition and other matériel and also provide medical services. The ships are named after German cities where German parliaments were placed.

Construction and career 

Bonn was laid down on 16 September 2010 and launched on 27 April 2011 at Hamburg, Germany. She was commissioned on 30 September 2013.

Bonn participated in BALTOPS 2019 and she came alongside to replenish  during the exercise.

References 

Berlin-class replenishment ships
2011 ships
Ships built in Hamburg